King Christian X's Liberty Medal was a commemorative decoration awarded by King Christian X for special services to Denmark during World War II.

Appearance
The medal is circular and made of silver.  It is suspended by an integral crown suspension.  The obverse bears the effigy in profile of King Christian X, facing right.  Inscribed around the edge is CHRISTIANUS X REX DANIÆ (Christian X King of the Danes).  The reverse is inscribed with PRO DANIA (for Denmark) and dated 1940-1945 surrounded by a wreath of oak leaves.

Recipients

Rolf Andvord
Bernt Balchen
Arne Berge
Winston Churchill
Alma Dahlerup
Nils-Eric Ekblad
Haakon VII of Norway
Olav V of Norway
George Petersen
Jan Smuts
Nils Swedlund
Ian Fleming
Konstantin Rokossovsky

References 

Orders, decorations, and medals of Denmark